Franska Kort is the fourth studio album from Swedish singer/songwriter Ted Gärdestad, released in 1976 through Polar Music. It contains the hits "Angela", "Chapeau-Claque", "När Showen Är Slut" and "Klöversnoa". The album was produced by Benny Andersson, Björn Ulvaeus, Michael B. Tretow and Gärdestad, while featuring vocals by Anni-Frid Lyngstad. It was re-released in 2009.

Track listing
All lyrics written by Kenneth Gärdestad, music by Ted Gärdestad

Side A:
"Angela" - 3:00  
"Franska Kort" - 3:52  
"Helt Nära Dej" - 3:13  
"Humbuggie-Woogie" - 3:00  
"Betlehem" - 4:15

Side B:  
"Chapeau-Claque" - 3:55  
"Magical Girl" - 4:15  
"Kejsarens Kläder" - 4:00  
"Ring Ding Dingeling Dae (Sagan Om Riddaren I Kung Leijonhiertas Hov)"  - 3:10  
"När Showen Är Slut" - 3:43  
"Klöversnoa" - 2:00

Personnel
 Ted Gärdestad - lead vocals, acoustic guitar, piano
 Benny Andersson - piano, keyboards
 Per-Erik Hallin - piano, keyboards
 Björn J:son Lindh - piano, flute
 Björn Ulvaeus - acoustic guitar
 Janne Schaffer - acoustic guitar, electric guitar
 Lasse Wellander - electric guitar
 Mike Watson - bass guitar
 Rutger Gunnarsson - bass
 Ola Brunkert - drums
 Rolf Alex - drums
 Roger Palm - drums
 Jan Kling - bass clarinet, saxophone
 Ulf Andersson - saxophone
 Sven Larsson - tuba 
 Malando Gassama - percussion
 Anni-Frid Lyngstad - backing vocals
 Lena Andersson - backing vocals
 Ann-Louise Hanson - backing vocals
 Maritza Horn - backing vocals
 Inger Öst - backing vocals
 Anders Glenmark - backing vocals
 Lasse Holm - backing vocals
 Lasse Westmann - backing vocals

Production 
 Benny Andersson - producer
 Björn Ulvaeus - producer
 Ted Gärdestad - producer
 Michael B. Tretow - producer and sound engineer
 Rutger Gunnarsson - string arrangements
 Wlodek Gulgowski - string arrangements
 Recorded at Metronome Studios and Glen Studios, Stockholm
 Originally released as Polar POLS 269, 1976.

Charts

References

1976 albums
Ted Gärdestad albums
Swedish-language albums